Charles Simon Pasquier (born 3 June 1914, date of death unknown) was a Belgian canoeist who competed in the 1936 Summer Olympics.  He was born in Brussels.  In 1936 he and his partner Armand Pagnoulle finished eighth in the folding K-2 10000 m event.

References
 Charles Pasquier's profile at Sports Reference.com

1914 births
Year of death missing
Belgian male canoeists
Canoeists at the 1936 Summer Olympics
Olympic canoeists of Belgium
Sportspeople from Brussels
20th-century Belgian people